The 1899–1900 season was the sixth in the history of the Southern League. This season saw the expansion of Division One up to 17 teams, though two of them resigned from league before the end of the season. Tottenham Hotspur were Division One champions for the first time, but no Southern League clubs applied for election to the Football League.

Division One

A total of 17 teams contested the division, including 13 sides from previous season and four new teams.

Teams promoted from Division Two
 Cowes
 Thames Ironworks
Newly elected teams
 Queens Park Rangers
 Bristol Rovers
 Portsmouth

Division Two

A total of 11 teams contested the division, including nine sides from previous season and two new teams.

Newly elected teams:
 Dartford - members of Kent League
 Grays United

Promotion-relegation test matches
At the end of the season, test matches were held between the bottom two clubs in Division One and the top two clubs in Division Two. Thames Ironworks retained their place in Division One after beating Fulham 5–1, whilst Watford were promoted after beating Sheppey United 2–1, a result which saw the latter relegated.

References

External links 
Southern League Second Division Tables at RSSSF
Swindon Town's season - results, dates, goalscorers and attendances at Swindon-Town-FC.co.uk

1899-1900
1899–1900 in English association football leagues